Kuwajimalla kagaensis is an extinct species of plant-eating lizard from the Early Cretaceous Kuwajima Formation in Japan.  K. kagaensis is the type species.

References

 New Fossil Is World's Oldest Plant-Eating Lizard

Cretaceous lizards
Early Cretaceous reptiles of Asia
Fossils of Japan
Fossil taxa described in 2008
Scincogekkonomorpha